Luigi Di Pasquale (born June 12, 1919 in Udine) was an Italian professional football player.

He played for 3 seasons (17 games, 3 goals) in the Serie A for A.S. Roma.

Honours
 Serie A champion: 1941/42.

1919 births
Year of death missing
Italian footballers
Serie A players
Udinese Calcio players
A.S. Roma players
Calcio Padova players
A.C. Cesena players
Association football forwards